The 1966–67 Primeira Divisão was the 33rd season of top-tier football in Portugal.

Overview
It was contested by 14 teams, and S.L. Benfica won the championship.

League standings

Results

References

External links
 Portugal 1966-67 - RSSSF (Jorge Miguel Teixeira)
 Portuguese League 1966/67 - footballzz.co.uk
 Portugal - Table of Honor - Soccer Library

Primeira Liga seasons
1966–67 in Portuguese football
Portugal